Hoenia is a genus of moths of the family Crambidae. It contains only one species, Hoenia sinensis, which is found in China (Zhejiang).

References

Scopariinae
Crambidae genera
Monotypic moth genera